is a professional Japanese baseball player. He is a pitcher for the Saitama Seibu Lions of Nippon Professional Baseball (NPB).

References 

1998 births
Living people
Baseball people from Nagano Prefecture
Nippon Professional Baseball pitchers
Saitama Seibu Lions players
Nippon Professional Baseball Rookie of the Year Award winners